Tachyon Publications is an independent press specializing in science fiction and fantasy books.  Founded in San Francisco in 1995 by Jacob Weisman, Tachyon books have tended toward high-end literary works, short story collections, and anthologies.

In 2013, Tachyon's publication After the Fall, Before the Fall, During the Fall by Nancy Kress won the Nebula Award and Locus Award for best novella. Also in 2013, Tachyon's publication of The Emperor's Soul by Brandon Sanderson won the Hugo Award for best novella.

From 1992 to 1994, Weisman also published Thirteenth Moon magazine, which featured short stories, poetry and essays by authors including Vicki Aron, Michael Astrov, M.J. Atkins, Simon Baker, Michael Bishop, Fred Branfman, Lela E. Buis, Paul Di Filippo, Linda Dunn, Alma Garcia, Lisa Goldstein, Brice Gorman, John Grey, Eva Hauser, Deborah Hunt, Knute Johnson, Lewis Jordan, Ursula K. Le Guin, Mary Soon Lee, Pamela Lovell, David Nemec, Lyn Nichols, Robert Patrick, David Sandner, Brian Skinner, Lia Smith, P. Stillman, Rob Sullivan, Pat Toomay, Inti Valverde, Peter Weverka and Wayne Wightman.

Books published
The following books have been published by Tachyon Publications.

References

External links

SF in SF – Science Fiction, San Francisco – A Perfect Fit

1995 establishments in California
Book publishing companies based in San Francisco
Companies based in San Francisco
Publishing companies based in the San Francisco Bay Area
Science fiction publishers